Batas ng Lansangan is a 2002 Philippine action film starring Fernando Poe Jr., who directed the film under the moniker Ronwaldo Reyes, Dina Bonnevie and Roi Vinzon.

Cast
 Fernando Poe Jr. as Maj. Ruben Medrano
 Dina Bonnevie as Mariel
 Roi Vinzon as Carlos
 Robert Arevalo as Ramon
 Ricardo Cepeda as Fr. Roland
 Kaye Abad as Marissa
 Angelica Reyes as Young Marissa
 Paquito Diaz as Chairman Lucero
 Dick Israel as Dodong
 Charlie Davao as Montenegro
 Lorena Garcia as Jaq
 Jessette Prospero as Ester
 Maita Sanchez as Alicia
 Toby Alejar as Bert
 Josie Galvez as Manang
 Jimmy Reyes as Alex Pusher
 Remy Javier as Aling Remy
 Bong Francisco as Convict
 Ernie Zarate as Convict's Father
 Leo Gamboa as Nonoy Kalbo
 Robert Miller as Nonoy's Hitman
 Olive Madridejos as Lucero's Wife
 Wilson Go as Businessman
 Bon Vibar as Priest
 Avel Morado as Slaughterhouse Foreman
 Joy Tan as Bar Floor Manager

References

External links

2002 films
2002 action films
Filipino-language films
Philippine action films
Films with screenplays by Pablo S. Gomez
Maverick Films films
Films directed by Fernando Poe Jr.